Maheshwaram Assembly constituency is a constituency of Telangana Legislative Assembly, India. It is one of 14 constituencies in Ranga Reddy district. It is part of Chevella Lok Sabha constituency. It is also one of the 24 constituencies of Greater Hyderabad Municipal Corporation.

Sabitha Indra Reddy is currently representing the constituency.

Overview
It is a newly formed constituency, created just before the 2009 general election; as per Delimitation Act of 2002
The Assembly Constituency presently comprises the following Mandals

Members of Legislative Assembly

Election results

Telangana Legislative Assembly election, 2018

Telangana Legislative Assembly election, 2014

Andhra Pradesh Legislative Assembly election, 2009

See also
 Maheshwaram
 List of constituencies of Telangana Legislative Assembly

References

Assembly constituencies of Telangana
Ranga Reddy district